Honoria Somerville Keer (26 December 1883 – 20 March 1969) was a British surgeon during World War I, where she served as a medical officer with the Girton and Newnham Unit of the Scottish Women's Hospitals for Foreign Service, which offered volunteer opportunities for medical women who were prohibited at the time from serving with the Royal Army Medical Corps. She was honoured by France and Serbia for her services.

Early life, education and service in World War I 
Honoria Somerville Keer was born in Toronto, Canada, the daughter of Major General Jonathan Keer (1825–1907), formerly of HM Bengal Staff Corps, and Eliza Somerville (1848–1921). Caroline Keer was her elder half-sister by their father. Honoria studied medicine at the University of Glasgow and graduated MBChB in 1910; she was registered as a medical practitioner in April of the same year.

She worked initially at Glasgow Royal Asylum, Gartnavel, and as House Surgeon at Kilmarnock, but joined the Girton and Newnham Unit of the Scottish Women's Hospitals in 1915. She served as a medical officer first in France and then in Salonika, and in 1918 she became Chief Medical Officer of the unit for medical care of Serbian refugees in Ajaccio, Corsica, until 1919. For her wartime service she was awarded the French Croix de Guerre and Médaille des Epidémies, and the Serbian Order of St Sava. Keer was described by one of her colleagues, Isabel Emslie, as ‘a strange mass of contradictions: serious, reserved, and with very correct old-world manners'; at the same time, 'her sly wit was a constant joy’.

Later career 
After obtaining the Diploma in Tropical Medicine & Hygiene from the London School of Tropical Medicine (1924), Keer was appointed to the post of Lady Medical Officer at the Massey Street Dispensary, Lagos, Nigeria, where she worked, except for a period of home/sick leave in 1931, until 1934. In that year, she retired to live in Bayswater, London, as illness abroad had resulted in hearing problems. In World War II she was active in civil defence with the Women's Voluntary Service.

She died in London in 1969.

Awards and honours
 Croix de Guerre
 Médaille d'Honneur (France)
 Order of St. Sava (Serbia) medals for her services during the Great War.

References

External links
 University of Glasgow archives

1883 births
1969 deaths
Alumni of the University of Glasgow
Alumni of the London School of Hygiene & Tropical Medicine
20th-century English medical doctors
British surgeons
People from Kent
British women medical doctors
British women in World War I
Recipients of the Croix de Guerre 1914–1918 (France)
Recipients of the Order of St. Sava
20th-century women physicians
20th-century surgeons